Anydrophila is a genus of moths of the family Noctuidae.

Selected species
Anydrophila mirifica (Erschoff, 1874)
Anydrophila sabouraudi (D. Lucas, 1907)
Anydrophila stuebeli (Calberla, 1891) (formerly Drasteria stuebeli)

References
Natural History Museum Lepidoptera genus database
Anydrophila at funet

Catocalinae
Noctuoidea genera